Żabin  is a village in the administrative district of Gmina Banie Mazurskie, within Gołdap County, Warmian-Masurian Voivodeship, in northern Poland, close to the border with the Kaliningrad Oblast of Russia.

There are two cemeteries—one German, one Russian—from World War I located in the town.

The village has a population of 210.

References

Villages in Gołdap County